Katyn  is a rural locality (a selo) in Smolensky District of Smolensk Oblast, Russia, located approximately  to the west of Smolensk, the administrative center of the oblast. The village had a population of 1,737 in 2007.

Geography
It is situated to the west of the city of Smolensk (about 18 km from its center) and circa 60 km from the Russian borders with Belarus. It has a station on the Berlin-Warsaw-Minsk-Moscow international railway line.

History
Before World War I, Gnezdovo with the Katyn Forest belonged to the Koźliński family. In the 19th century, Piotr Koźliński married Leokadia Lefftreu, the daughter of the director of the English railway construction company in Russia. Under the marriage articles Gniezdovo and Katyn became co-owned by the British.

Katyn massacre

The Katyn Forest, in the vicinity of the village, was the site of the Katyn massacre during World War II, in which thousands of captured Polish officers and other citizens were killed. On 5 March 1940, Stalin approved, together with Voroshilov, Mikoyan and Molotov, a proposal from Beria that lead to the assassination of 21,857 Poles.

Despite claims by the Poles, the Soviet Union blamed Nazi Germany for the mass murders and attempted to hide its involvement, going as far as to ban all mention of the Katyn massacre in the USSR. In 1990, Soviet leader Mikhail Gorbachev admitted that the NKVD had executed the Poles and confirmed two other burial sites similar to the site at Katyn: Mednoye and Piatykhatky. A number of earlier mass graves of victims of the Soviet system have also been found there, because Katyn Forest had long been used as an execution site for Soviet citizens.

The NKVD resolved to execute prisoners of war and "members of various counter-revolutionary organisations, former landowners, factory owners, former Polish officers, officials and escapees". In 2004, Polish prosecutors described this as a plan to eliminate in part the "intellectual elite of the Polish Nation", so as "to prevent the rebirth of Polish statehood". 

The 2007 Polish film Katyń, directed by Andrzej Wajda, is an interpretation of the events that led up to the mass execution.

Climate
Katyn has a warm-summer humid continental climate (Dfb in the Köppen climate classification).

See also
List of Polish Martyrdom sites
Bronisław Bohatyrewicz

References

External links

 Officiаl site of the State memorial  complex «Katyn»

Rural localities in Smolensk Oblast
Smolensky Uyezd